Strömsbergs IF is a Swedish football club located in Tierp in Uppsala County.

Background
Since their foundation Strömsbergs IF has participated mainly in the middle and lower divisions of the Swedish football league system.  Following promotion at the end of the 2009 season, the club currently plays in Division 2 Norrland which is the fourth tier of Swedish football. They play their home matches at the Strömbergs IP, Heden in Tierp.

Strömsbergs IF are affiliated to the Upplands Fotbollförbund.

Season to season

Attendances

In recent seasons Strömsbergs IF have had the following average attendances:

The attendance record for Strömsbergs IF was 475 spectators for the match against Sandvikens IF in Division 2 Norra Svealand on 24 June 2010.

External links
 Strömsbergs IF – Official Website

Footnotes

Sport in Uppsala County
Football clubs in Uppsala County
Association football clubs established in 1912
1912 establishments in Sweden